Přední Kopanina is a suburb of Prague, Czech Republic. First mentioned in 1285, it was incorporated as a municipal district of Prague in 1974. The main local sight is a Romanesque rotunda of St Mary Magdalene from the first half of the 12th century.

External links
  Official website

Districts of Prague